Studies in American Demography is a 1940 book, written by Walter F. Willcox and published by Cornell University Press. It was one of the first publications to estimate the world population had exceeded 1 billion people in 1800.

References

1940 non-fiction books
Demographic history of the United States